Pavel Shcheglovsky (born 9 September 1972) is a Russian bobsledder. He competed in the two man and the four man events at the 1998 Winter Olympics.

References

1972 births
Living people
Russian male bobsledders
Olympic bobsledders of Russia
Bobsledders at the 1998 Winter Olympics
Sportspeople from Moscow